Omar Nimr Nabulsi (born April 1, 1936) is a retired Jordanian Ambassador.

Career
From 1959 to 1961 he was Legal Adviser of the Saudi Automotive Services Company (Sasco Petroleum), Tripoli (Libya).
From 1961 to 1969 he was Legal and Political Attaché at the Arab League. 
From 1960 to 1970 he was assistant director at the Royal Court of Jordan.
From 1970 to 1972 he was Minister of Economy in the cabinet of Wasfi al-Tal.
From 1972 to  he was ambassador in London (United Kingdom), with concurrent Diplomatic accreditation in The Hague and Lisbon.
From  to  he was minister of agriculture in the cabinet of Zaid al-Rifai.
From  to  he was minister of economy. in the cabinet of Zaid al-Rifai.
From  to  he was legal and economic adviser to Arab Fund for Economic and Social Development in Kuwait City..
From  to  he was Lawyer and Consultant in Corporate and Business Legal affairs.
In 1980 he was Minister of Labor and Construction.
From 1989 to 1993 he was appointed Senator.
He was Member of the National Consultative Council of Jordan.
 He is a first class member of the Order of the Star of Jordan.

References

1936 births
Living people
Economy ministers of Jordan
Ambassadors of Jordan to the United Kingdom
Agriculture ministers of Jordan
Construction ministers of Jordan
Members of the Senate of Jordan